Act of Love (French title: Un acte d'amour) is a 1953 American romantic drama film directed by Anatole Litvak, starring Kirk Douglas and Dany Robin. It is based on the 1949 novel The Girl on the Via Flaminia by Alfred Hayes. A Parisian falls in love with an American soldier near the end of World War II.

Plot
Robert Teller (Kirk Douglas) visits a seaport in the south of France in the early 1950s. He reflects back to his time in the army shortly after Paris has been liberated.

Years earlier, to get away from the barracks and the other soldiers, Robert rents a room in a hotel-restaurant. Lise Guidayec (Dany Robin), an orphan without money or identity papers, seeks a way to escape from the authorities. She asks Robert to pass her off as his wife. Even though he does not inspire trust, she starts to fall in love with him. Lise tells of the time she was the most happy and secure—living in a little seaside village.

When a black market dragnet lands Lise in jail, she is humiliated because now she (like Jean Valjean) is branded a "criminal for life". By this time, Robert loves her deeply and is willing to marry her. In order to do so, Robert must obtain the approval of his commanding officer, who refuses because the captain thinks he knows what is best for his men. Robert is transferred away from Paris immediately. He deserts, but is arrested, causing him to miss his wedding to Lise.

His thoughts returning to the present, Robert runs into his old captain (who had been trying to place Robert's face). He hears the captain tell his wife what a troublemaker Robert was back then and how he "rescued" Robert from the clutches of a French girl. Robert then reveals that Lise committed suicide by drowning in the river shortly after he was transferred.

Cast
 Kirk Douglas as Robert Teller
 Dany Robin as Lise Gudayec / Madame Teller
 Gabrielle Dorziat as Adèle Lacaud
 Barbara Laage as Nina
 Fernand Ledoux as Fernand Lacaud
 Robert Strauss as S/Sgt. Johnny Blackwood
 Marthe Mercadier as La fille de la terrasse / Young woman
 George Mathews as Captain Henderson
 Richard Benedict as Pete (GI who is rolled for his money)
 Leslie Dwyer as Le sergent anglais / English sergeant
 Sydney Chaplin as Un soldat / Soldier
 Brigitte Bardot as Mimi
 Nedd Willard		
 Serge Reggiani as Claude Lacaud

References

External links
 
 
 
 

1953 romantic drama films
1953 films
American romantic drama films
French romantic drama films
Films directed by Anatole Litvak
American black-and-white films
French black-and-white films
Films based on British novels
Films based on romance novels
Films set in 1945
Films set in 1946
Films set in France
Films with screenplays by Irwin Shaw
United Artists films
English-language French films
American World War II films
French World War II films
1950s American films
1950s French films